Langnes is a village in Senja Municipality in Troms og Finnmark county, Norway. The population (2001) of the village is 189.

References

Senja
Villages in Troms
Populated places of Arctic Norway